Wave loading is most commonly the application of a pulsed or wavelike load to a material or object.  This is most commonly used in the analysis of piping, ships, or building structures which experience wind, water, or seismic disturbances.

Examples of wave loading
 Offshore storms and pipes: As large waves pass over shallowly buried pipes, water pressure increases above it.  As the trough approaches, pressure over the pipe drops and this sudden and repeated variation in pressure can break pipes. The difference in pressure for a wave with wave height of about 10 m would be equivalent to one atmosphere (101.3 kPa or 14.7 psi) pressure variation between crest and trough and repeated fluctuations over pipes in relatively shallow environments could set up resonance vibrations within pipes or structures and cause problems.
 Engineering oil platforms: The effects of wave-loading are a serious issue for engineers designing oil platforms, which must contend with the effects of wave loading, and have devised a number of algorithms to do so.

References

Waves
Articles containing video clips